Balaram Ambaji Wildlife Sanctuary is located at Banaskantha, Gujarat, India. It covers 542 km2, and falls in the catchment area of Banas and Sabarmati rivers, and is a part of the Khathiar-Gir dry deciduous forests' ecoregion. The sanctuary borders Rajasthan and close to mount abu. The period from October to May is considered to be the best time to visit.

Flora 

The sanctuary has 483 species of plants. 10 species are of lower plants, 40 of grass, 49 of climbers, 58 of shrubs, 107 of trees and 219 of herbs. Some of these, such as the Kadaya, have medicinal properties.

Fauna 
Mammals found here are the sloth bear, striped hyena, Indian leopard, Nilgai (bluebull), Indian porcupine, Indian fox, small Indian civet and Indian pangolin. Reptiles found here are snakes (venomous and non-venomous), Indian star tortoises and monitor lizards.

In 2016, a female sloth bear had attacked 8 people, including some forest officials, in Gujarat State's Banaskantha district, near the Sanctuary. 3 of the victims died, including an official who attempted to trace and cage it. The bear was eventually killed by a team of forest officials and policemen.

See also 
 Balaram River
 Balaram Palace
 Wildlife of India

References 

Wildlife sanctuaries in Gujarat
Tourist attractions in Banaskantha district
Protected areas established in 1989
1989 establishments in Gujarat
Khathiar-Gir dry deciduous forests